Tartu is the second largest city in Estonia.

Tartu may also refer to:

Places
 Tartu (urban municipality), an urban municipality containing the city and an adjacent rural area
 Tartu County, in which the city is located
 Tartu Parish, a rural municipality in Tartu County neighbouring the city
 35618 Tartu, an asteroid

Historical events
 Siege of Tartu (1224), part of the Christian conquest of Estonia
 Treaty of Tartu (Russian–Estonian), a February 1920 peace treaty between the Russian Soviet Federated Socialist Republic and newly independent Estonia 
 Treaty of Tartu (Russian–Finnish), an October 1920 peace treaty between the Russian Soviet Federated Socialist Republic and newly independent Finland
 Battle of Tartu (1941), a World War II battle for the city
 Tartu Offensive (1944), a World War II offensive

Military
 Tartu Air Base or Raadi Airfield, a former air base northeast of the city of Tartu
 Jean-François Tartu (1751-1793), French naval officer
 French frigate Uranie (1788), renamed Tartu in honour of Jean-François Tartu
 French destroyer Tartu (1931), a destroyer named in honour of Jean-François Tartu
 French destroyer Tartu (D636), a T 53-class destroyer named in honour of Jean-François Tartu

Schools in Tartu, Estonia
 University of Tartu, the largest university in Estonia
 Tartu Academy of Theology, a private university
 Estonian Aviation Academy, a public university known as Tartu Aviation College before 1996
 Tartu Art College, an upper secondary vocational art school

Other uses
 Tartu College, a student residence in Toronto, Canada
 Tartu Cathedral, Tartu, Estonia
 Tartu Observatory, the largest astronomical observatory in Estonia
 Tartu Ülikool Korvpallimeeskond, an Estonian professional basketball club based in Tartu
 The Adventures of Tartu, a Second World War spy film reissued in the US under the title Tartu
 Tartu, a variety of the South Estonian language